"The Oaf" is a song by Canadian-American rock group Big Wreck. It was released in October 1997 as the lead single from their debut studio album, In Loving Memory Of.... It charted well in Canada and is the band's highest-ever charting single in the U.S. Between 1995 and 2016, "The Oaf" was the sixth most played song by a Canadian artist on rock radio stations in Canada.

Charts

References

Songs about luck
1997 singles
Songs written by Ian Thornley
1997 songs
Atlantic Records singles